Seyyed Mohammad Jafar Moravej (Persian: سید محمد جعفر مروج) whose complete name/fame is "Seyyed Muhammad Jafar Jazaeri Moravej al-Shariah" (Persian: سید محمد جعفر جزائری مروج الشریعه), was an Iranian Shia scholar who was born in 1910 and died in 1999, in a religious family in Shushtar. His father was Seyyed Muhammad Ali Moravej, and he is among the descendants of Seyyed Nematollah Jazayeri who was a prominent Shia scholar. This Shia scholar is commonly known as "Ayatollah Seyyed Muhammad Jafar Moravej" (Persian: آیت الله سید محمد جعفر مروج).

Seyyed Muhammad Jafar who was also known as "Seyyed Muhammad Jafar Jazayeri/(Mousavi)," finally died in 1999 in the city of Qom. The supreme leader of Iran, Seyyed Ali Khamenei was among the Iranian famous officials who expressed their condolence for the death of this Shia scholar; Iran's supreme leader presented a message about him that: "The demise news of honorable scholar, the blessed Ayatollah Seyyed Muhammad Jafar Mousavi Moravej (Rahmatullah-alaih) caused me to be regretted. He was among the prominent faqihs ..."

Teachers 
Among Seyyed Muhammad Jafar's teachers are:
 Abu l-Hasan al-Isfahani
 Agha Zia Addin Araghi
 Muhsin al-Hakim
 (Sheikh) Musa Khansari
 (Sheikh) Hossein Helli
Etc.

Works 

Seyyed Muhammad Jafar Jazaeri Moravej al-Shariah's compilations are more than 50 books, such as:

 Sharh (explanation of) Tahzib

 Sharh-Estebsar

 Sharh Awali al-La'ali

 Sharh Oyun Akhbar-al-Reza

 Sharh Nahj-al-Balaghah

 Qesas-al-Anbia

 Resalee dar sharh hadis lataad

 Resalee dar halq al-lahieh

 Resalee dar al-vatan al-sharee

 Resalee dar elme kalam

 Emal al-sebi

 Resalee dar derayah al-hadis

 Takmelah al-vasilah fi al-hodood va al-diat

 Masaeele mostahedese

 Montahi al-derayah fi tozih al-kefayah

 Hadi al-taleb ela sharh al-makaseb

 Sharh orvatol vosqa

 Ziya al-masalek

 Taliqe bar orvatol vosqa

 Hashie bar tozih al-masaeel

 Resalee dar qaeede la zarar

 Hashie bar vasile al-neja

 Al-qavaeed al-feqhie

 Resale fi hokm al-hakem fi al-helal

 Hedaye al-anaam

 Al-mabahes osoolieh

See also 
 Seyyed Nematollah Jazayeri
 Mohammad Ali Mousavi Jazayeri

References 

Iranian ayatollahs
1910 births
1999 deaths
Iranian Arab Islamic scholars
People from Shushtar
Burials at Fatima Masumeh Shrine
Al-Musawi Al-Jazayiri family